Alliance for Peace and Democracy may refer to:
Alliance for Peace and Democracy (Liberia), a political party in Liberia
Alliance for Peace and Democracy (Hong Kong), a political group in Hong Kong